The Amthausgasse is one of the streets in the Old City of Bern, the medieval city center of Bern, Switzerland.  It is part of the Innere Neustadt which was built during the expansion of 1255 to 1260.

One building, a Burgher house at Amthausgasse 5 is listed on the Swiss inventory of heritage site of national significance and it is part of the UNESCO Cultural World Heritage Site that encompasses the Old City.

References

Streets in Bern
Old City (Bern)